Northern Fury Football Club was an Australian professional soccer club based in Townsville, Queensland. The club was founded in 2008 and competed in the A-League under the name North Queensland Fury. On 1 March 2011, the club was removed from the league due to financial instability. On 3 October 2012, the club officially re-formed  after it was granted a licence to participate in the National Premier League Queensland. After rebranding themselves as "North Queensland United" in 2017, the club disbanded a second time at the end of the 2018 Football Queensland season. The club played their home fixtures at Townsville Sports Reserve.

History

Foundation 
A bid known as Northern Thunder FC (or North Queensland Thunder FC) was considered for admission for the 2008–09 season along with Gold Coast Galaxy. The bid was publicly well progressed, with the team's badge and colours (red, white and black) released. The training facilities were to be located at the North Queensland Institute of Sport and the home ground was to play at Dairy Farmers Stadium.

The bid was tentatively accepted to join in the 2008–09 season expanding the league to ten teams. Needing to meet certain financial criteria to be granted entry into the league, the club's major financial backer pulled out of the franchise on 5 March 2008, effectively collapsing the bid. Football Federation Australia determined on 11 March 2008 that neither Thunder or Galaxy would be granted entry "in the best interests of the league," given that a nine team format was generally unfavoured and delayed expansion of the league until the 2009–10 season.

With expansion put off until the following season, by June 2008 the FFA had received ten bids for new A–League teams, two of which came from Townsville – one headed by Melbourne businesswoman Milissa Fischer and one by local businessman Don Matheson. Matheson's bid, which "rose from the ashes of the Northern Thunder bid", was granted a provisional licence by Football Federation Australia on 24 July. On 28 August 2008 the franchise was accepted into the A–League by CEO Ben Buckley with the only matter outstanding the finalisation of all legal requirements.

On 6 November 2008, the franchise named was officially revealed as North Queensland Fury FC. Their inaugural kit was revealed in April 2009, featuring dark green sleeves/socks, and a white/light green front.

It was announced on 10 December 2008, that the Fury had signed Rockhampton–born businessman Dean Hassall as their CEO. Also the club signed Scottish club, Celtic's strength and conditioning coach Alan McCall and was also joined by Football Operations Manager Nicholas Deluca.

Struggles and demise 
On 7 June 2010, former Sparta Prague and one time Czech Republic national team coach František Straka was announced as the club's coach for the coming 2010–11 A-League season after agreeing to a one-year deal.

The club finished last in the 2010/11 A-League season, winning only 4 of their 30 matches. The crowd average of 4,245 was the 4th lowest in the history of the A-League behind the Gold Coast United crowd average of the same season and the two seasons of the New Zealand Knights.

A community ownership model was launched, aimed at finding 1.5 million dollars (per year, for three years), of capital investment being sought to cover half the expected losses for the next three seasons. Ben Buckley, in an open letter to Fury supporters, made it clear that the FFA would not fund continual losses.

On 1 March 2011, the club officially had its A-League licence revoked due to financial reasons. The FFA reported that the Fury had received only $300,000 of the investment required for the next season, and despite increased sponsorship revenue the club would still lose $2 to $3 million. FFA released a statement confirming earlier reports that a decision had been taken not to continue with the franchise as the financial position of the club for season 2011–2012 considered too big of a financial risk for the FFA to undertake.

Re-establishment and further demise
On 3 October 2012, the club was officially re-established after it was announced that the club would participate in the 2013 NPL Queensland Conference, with North Queensland Football forming the new board. The club made an announcement that they would keep the old North Queensland Fury logo. On 12 November 2012 the club announced former player Gareth Edds would take up the head coach role as well as field his position at the club.

On 13 September 2017, the club announced that it would be dropping the Northern Fury name and colours in favour of the name "North Queensland United" and the region's traditional football colours of blue, red and gold.

At the end of the 2018 Football Queensland season, NQ United disbanded again.

Rivalries 
Northern Fury had a rivalry with fellow North Queensland NPL team Far North Queensland FC (now called Cairns FC), with both teams contesting the Frank Farina Cup.

Colours and badge 
North Queensland's colours were light and dark green and white. These were chosen to represent the lush green vegetation of the northern parts of Queensland. The badge was revealed in 2008 soon after the bid was granted entry to A-League. The light green was often referred to in the local media as "tropical green" but was particularly unpopular with many fans of the club.

The North Queensland Fury played at Dairy Farmers Stadium in the A-League and the Townsville Sports Reserve in the NPL Queensland.

Players who earned International caps whilst at North Queensland 
  Shane Stefanutto
  David Williams
  Jeremy Brockie
  Eugene Sseppuya

Managers

Competition timeline

Honours

Minor Trophies/Honours 
   Queensland Nickel Cup
 2009/10 (NQ Fury vs Gold Coast United: {Contested Over 3 League Fixtures} NQ Fury W2/D0/L1)
   Chief Minister's Cup
 – 2009 (3–2 vs Adelaide United – Played In Darwin/NT 02/07/09)

All time league records 
Record victory: 8–0 vs SWQ Thunder (H), 16 March 2014
Record defeat: 1–8 vs Adelaide United (A), 21 January 2011
Highest league crowd: 8,897 vs Sydney FC, 8 August 2009
Lowest league crowd: 600 vs Olympic FC, 27 July 2013*
Winning streak: 3 games (29 June 2013 – 13 July 2013)
Undefeated streak: 6 games (9 June 2013 – 13 July 2013)
Losing streak: 14 games (22 August 2015 – 4 June 2016)
Winless streak: 23 games (22 August 2015 – present)
Goals in a game: 4 – Gareth Edds vs Olympic FC (H), 27 July 2013 & Braedyn Crowley vs SWQ Thunder (H), 16 March 2014
Goals in a season: 17 – Braedyn Crowley, 2014
Most assists in a season: 13 – Reyze Kelly, 2013

Note: From 2013 onwards, the Fury played at stadiums where the capacity can only reach approximately 3,000.

Appearances

Goals

See also 
 List of North Queensland Fury FC players

References

External links 
 Northern Fury FC official website
 Official photographs of the North Queensland Fury FC 2010 Awards night 

 
Former A-League Men teams
Association football clubs established in 2008
Association football clubs disestablished in 2018
Sport in Townsville
National Premier Leagues clubs
Soccer clubs in Queensland
2008 establishments in Australia
2018 disestablishments in Australia
Defunct soccer clubs in Australia